The following is a list of Italian municipalities (comuni) with a population over 50,000. The table below contains the cities populations as of 31 December 2021, as estimated by the Italian National Institute of Statistics, and the cities census population from the 2011 Italian Census.
Cities in bold are regional capitals.

Cities

Gallery

Map of the cities

See also
Metropolitan cities of Italy
List of metropolitan areas of Italy

References 

 
Italy
Italy